David Marland (born 27 July 1966) is a professional Australian darts player who plays in World Darts Federation and Professional Darts Corporation events.

A real estate owner by trade, he is an occasional dart player, but did win the 2016 Warilla Bowls Club Open, and qualified for the 2017 Melbourne Darts Masters, where he was whitewashed by Daryl Gurney.

References

External links
Profile and stats on Darts Database

1966 births
Living people
Australian darts players
Professional Darts Corporation associate players